The album 0101 was Shikao Suga's first single, and first indies single, released by Bounce Records (bounce-0015) on November 15, 1995.  It was the only album released under his real name (菅 止戈男). The song "Ai ni tsuite" would be included as part of the 4th single made under Office Augusta 2 years later.

Track listing

References

1995 albums
Shikao Suga albums